The London, Midland and Scottish Railway (LMS) Kitson 0-4-0ST was a class of 0-4-0 saddle tank steam locomotive designed for light shunting.

History
Five were originally designed and built by Kitson and Company of Leeds to LMS specification in 1932 and numbered 1500–1504. They were similar to other shunters built for industrial use. The manufacturer's works numbers were 5644–5648. The LMS classified them 0F. These were later renumbered 7000–7004 in 1935/1936. British Railways (BR) added 40000 to their numbers after nationalization in 1948, becoming 47000–47004. Between 1953 and 1954, BR constructed an additional five at Horwich Works, numbered 47005–47009. These differed from the original batch having shorter saddle tanks with extra space given to longer coal bunkers instead.

Some saw use on the Cromford and High Peak Railway in Derbyshire. Withdrawals took place between 1963 and 1966, and no examples were preserved.

Stock list

In fiction 
In The Railway Series books by the Reverend W. Awdry, a character called 'Pug' appears in the 12th book, The Eight Famous Engines. After problems of consistent accuracy of the drawings in the early books, later characters were based more closely on real locomotives. Although not explicitly identified by Awdry, the locomotive in the illustration by John T. Kenney, has been identified as most closely resembling a LMS Kitson 0-4-0ST.

Notes

References

External links
 Class 0F-C Details at Rail UK

0 Kitson 0-4-0ST
0-4-0ST locomotives
Kitson locomotives
Railway locomotives introduced in 1932
Scrapped locomotives
Standard gauge steam locomotives of Great Britain
Shunting locomotives